Liam John Coleman (born October 1966) is the chief executive officer of The Co-operative Bank. He replaced Niall Booker at the end of 2016. He was formerly deputy chief executive at the bank and before that a director of Nationwide Building Society. Coleman has a BA in geography from the University of Manchester and an MBA from the University of Warwick.

References

Living people
British bankers
British chief executives
Alumni of the University of Warwick
1966 births
Alumni of the University of Manchester